Cancer procoagulant is a hypothesised protein, most likely a cysteine protease enzyme, that occurs only in fetal and malignant cells. Its activity appears to be the activation of factor X, one of the coagulation factors, and would account for the increased incidence of thrombosis in cancer patients. Tissue factor (TF) is also known to be present at increased levels around malignant cells.

References

External links 
 

EC 3.4.22